Zhangshabu is a station and the southern terminus on Line 10 of the Shenyang Metro. The station opened on 29 April 2020.

Station Layout

References 

Railway stations in China opened in 2020
Shenyang Metro stations